Misandry is the hatred of, contempt for, or prejudice against men.

Men's rights activists and other masculinist groups have criticized modern laws concerning divorce, domestic violence, conscription, circumcision (known as male genital mutilation by opponents), and treatment of male rape victims as examples of institutional misandry.

In the Internet Age, users posting on manosphere internet forums such 4chan and subreddits addressing men's rights activism (MRAs), claim that misandry is widespread, established in the preferential treatment of women, and shown by discrimination against men. This viewpoint is denied by most sociologists, anthropologists and scholars of gender studies who counter that misandry is not at all established as a cultural institution, nor is it equivalent to misogyny which is many times more prevalent in scope, far more deeply rooted in society, and more severe in its consequences. Scholars criticize MRAs for promoting a false equivalence between misandry and misogyny. The modern activism around misandry represents an antifeminist backlash, promoted by marginalized men.

Misandry can be racialized. According to some researchers in Black Male Studies such as Tommy J. Curry, Black men and boys face anti-Black misandry. E. C. Krell, a gender researcher, uses the term racialized transmisandry describing the experience of Black transmasculine people.

Etymology

Misandry is formed from the Greek misos (μῖσος, "hatred") and anēr, andros (ἀνήρ, gen. ἀνδρός; "man"). "Misandrous" or "misandrist" can be used as adjectival forms of the word. Use of the word can be found as far back as the 19th century, including an 1871 use in The Spectator magazine. It appeared in Merriam-Webster's Collegiate Dictionary (11th ed.) in 1952. Translation of the French  to the German  (Hatred of Men) is recorded in 1803.

A term with a similar but distinct meaning is androphobia, which describes a fear, but not necessarily hatred, of men. Writer Helen Pluckrose has argued that androphobia is a better term when the aversion to men stems from a sense of fear. Anthropologist David D. Gilmore coined a similar term—"viriphobia"—to show that misandry typically targets the virile male machismo, "the obnoxious manly ", along with the oppressive male roles of patriarchy. Gilmore says that misandry is not the hatred of men as men; this kind of loathing is present only in misogyny which is the hatred of women as women.

Background
The term misandry started to be used in men's rights literature and academic literature on structural prejudice in the early 1980s. It has been used on the internet such as usenet, and blogs since at least 1989. Usage of the term misandry in the internet age is an outgrowth of antifeminism and misogyny. The term is commonly used in the manosphere, such as on men's rights discussion forums on websites such as 4chan and reddit, to counter feminist accusations of misogyny. The critique and parody of the concept of misandry by feminist bloggers was reported on in periodicals such as The Guardian, Slate and Time  in 2014.

Overview
Men's rights activists and other masculinist groups have criticized modern laws concerning divorce, domestic violence, the draft, circumcision (known as genital mutilation by opponents), and treatment of male rape victims as examples of institutional misandry. The word misandry forms a core part of the vocabulary of manosphere online spaces. The use of this term in the manosphere provides justification for harassment of people espousing feminist ideas by online groups, citing Gamergate as an example. Arguments based on the concept of misandry are used by the men's rights movement to counter feminist accusations of misogyny.

Proposed examples of misandry in popular culture include frequent portrayals of men as absent, insensitive, or abusive, as well as a legal process that discriminates against men in divorce proceedings, or in cases of domestic or sexual violence where the victim is a man. Other examples include social problems that lead to men's shorter lifespans, higher suicide rates, requirements to participate in military drafts, and lack of tax benefits afforded to widowers compared to widows. In a 2016 Washington Post article, Cathy Young wrote that terms using "man" as a derogatory prefix, such as mansplaining, manspreading, and manterrupting, are part of a "current cycle of misandry".

Religious studies professors Paul Nathanson and Katherine Young examined the institutionalization of misandry in the public sphere in their 2001 three-book series Beyond the Fall of Man, which refers to misandry as a "form of prejudice and discrimination that has become institutionalized in North American society", writing, "The same problem that long prevented mutual respect between Jews and Christians, the teaching of contempt, now prevents mutual respect between men and women."

Warren Farrell is a men's rights activist trained as a political scientist, who has written on feminism and men's rights. Farrell argues that men's rights publications are censored online and it is difficult to publish books on the topic compared to feminist issues. He argues that men are often socially rejected for expressing feelings, while at the same time being blamed for not doing so. He argues that there is gender bias, reinforced by feminism, of who is considered to deserve protection and who is held accountable for problems with women tending to be seen as both unaccountable while needing protection, arguing that this needs to change to remove gender roles. Responding, James P. Sterba argues that women may have been excluded from dangerous professions such as the military to protect male status, citing the example of Eritrean–Ethiopian War where he argues women gained status in society by virtue of fighting in the war and contrasting it with Israel where he says that women's exclusion from military national service and the military in general diminishes their status and as a result their influence in politics.

In psychology

Glick and Fiske developed psychometric constructs to measure the attitudes of individuals towards men in their Ambivalence toward Men Inventory, AMI, which includes a factor Hostility toward Men. These metrics were based on a small group discussion with women which identified factors, these number of questions were then reduced using statistical methods. Hostility toward Men was split into three factors: Resentment of Paternalism, the belief men supported male power, Compensatory Gender Differentiation, the belief that men were supported by women and Heterosexual Hostility, which looked at beliefs that men were likely to engage in hostile actions. The combined construct, Hostility toward Men, was found to be inversely correlated with measures of gender equality when comparing difference countries and in a study with university students, self-describing feminists were found to have a lower score.

In literature

Ancient Greek literature

Classics professor Froma Zeitlin of Princeton University discussed misandry in her article titled "Patterns of Gender in Aeschylean Drama: Seven against Thebes and the Danaid Trilogy". She writes:

Shakespeare 

Literary critic Harold Bloom argued that even though the word misandry is relatively unheard of in literature, it is not hard to find implicit, even explicit, misandry. In reference to the works of Shakespeare, Bloom argued:

Modern literature 

Anthony Synnott argues that there is a tendency in literature to represent men as villains and women as victims and argues that there is a market for "anti-male" novels with no corresponding "anti-female" market, citing The Women's Room, by Marilyn French, and The Color Purple, by Alice Walker. He gives examples of comparisons of men to Nazi prison guards as a common theme in literature.

Racialized misandry occurs in both "high" and "low" culture and literature. For instance, African-American men have often been disparagingly portrayed as either infantile or as eroticized and hyper-masculine, depending on prevailing cultural stereotypes.

Julie M. Thompson, a feminist author, connects misandry with envy of men, in particular "penis envy", a term coined by Sigmund Freud in 1908, in his theory of female sexual development. Nancy Kang has discussed "the misandric impulse" in relation to the works of Toni Morrison.

In his book, Gender and Judaism: The Transformation of Tradition, Harry Brod, a Professor of Philosophy and Humanities in the Department of Philosophy and Religion at the University of Northern Iowa, writes:

In 2020, the explicitly misandric essay Moi, les hommes, je les déteste (I Hate Men) by the French writer Pauline Harmange caused controversy in France after a government official threatened its publisher with criminal prosecution.

Misandry and feminism

The role of misandry in feminism is controversial and has been debated both within and outside feminist movements. Opponents of feminism often argue that feminism is misandristic; citing examples such as opposition to shared parenting by NOW, or opposition to equal rape and domestic violence laws. The validity of these perceptions and of the concept has been claimed as promoting a false equivalence between misandry and misogyny. Radical feminism has often been associated with misandry in the public consciousness. However, radical feminist arguments have also been misinterpreted, and individual radical feminists such as Valerie Solanas, best known for her attempted murder of Andy Warhol in 1968, have historically had a higher profile in popular culture than within feminist scholarship.

Historian Alice Echols, in her 1989 book Daring To Be Bad: Radical Feminism in America, 1967–1975, argued that Valerie Solanas displayed an extreme level of misandry in her tract the SCUM Manifesto, but wrote that it was not typical for radical feminists of the time. Echols stated: "Solanas's unabashed misandry—especially her belief in men's biological inferiority—her endorsement of relationships between 'independent women,' and her dismissal of sex as 'the refuge of the mindless' contravened the sort of radical feminism which prevailed in most women's groups across the country."

Echols also claims that, after her attempted murder, Solanas' SCUM Manifesto became more popular within radical feminism; but not all radical feminists shared her beliefs. For example, radical feminist Andrea Dworkin criticized the biological determinist strand in radical feminism that, in 1977, she found "with increasing frequency in feminist circles" which echoed the views of Valerie Solanas that males are biologically inferior to women and violent by nature, requiring a gendercide to allow for the emergence of a "new Übermensch Womon".

Individual viewpoints

bell hooks 
The author bell hooks conceptualized the issue of "man hating" during the early period of women's liberation as a reaction to patriarchal oppression and women who had bad experiences with men in non-feminist social movements. She also criticized separatist strands of feminism as "reactionary" for promoting the notion that men are inherently immoral, inferior, and unable to help end sexist oppression or benefit from feminism. In Feminism is For Everybody, hooks laments the fact that feminists who critiqued anti-male bias in the early women's movement never gained mainstream media attention and that "our theoretical work critiquing the demonization of men as the enemy did not change the perspective of women who were anti-male." She has theorized previously that this demonization led to an unnecessary rift between the Men's movement and the Women's movement.

Anthony Synnott 
Anthony Synnott, a sociologist who studies masculinities and men's issues, argues in his book Re-Thinking Men: Heroes, Villains and Victims that certain forms of feminism present misandristic view of gender. He argues that men are presented as having power over others regardless of the actual power they possess and that some feminists define the experience of being male inaccurately through writing on masculinity. He further argues that some forms of feminism create an in-group of women, simplifies the nuances of gender issues,  demonizes those who are not feminists and legimitizes victimization by way of retributive justice.

Reviewing Synnott, Roman Kuhar argues that Synnott might not accurately represent the views of feminism, commenting that "whether it re-thinks men in a manner in which men have not been thought of in feminist theory, is another question."

Nathanson and Young 
Religion scholars Paul Nathanson and Katherine K. Young argued that "ideological feminism" as opposed to "egalitarian feminism" has imposed misandry on culture. Their 2001 book, Spreading Misandry, analyzed "pop cultural artifacts and productions from the 1990s" from movies to greeting cards for what they considered to be pervasive messages of hatred toward men. Legalizing Misandry (2005), the second in the series, gave similar attention to laws in North America.

The methodology used by Nathanson and Young to research misandry has been criticized. In the book Angry White Men, Michael Kimmel argues that much of the misandry identified by Nathanson and Young is actually criticizing patriarchy. Kimmel condemns Nathanson and Young for their "selective, simplistic, and shallow" interpretations of sexism in film and fiction. Kimmel says that the "bad history" produced by Nathanson and Young should only be used as an indicator of how the "male studies enterprise" operates.

Individualist feminists 
Wendy McElroy, an individualist feminist, wrote in 2001 that some feminists "have redefined the view of the movement of the opposite sex" as "a hot anger toward men [that] seems to have turned into a cold hatred". She argued it was a misandrist position to consider men, as a class, to be irreformable or rapists.

In a 2016 article, individualist feminist Cathy Young described a "current cycle of misandry" in feminism. This cycle, she explains, includes the use of the term "mansplaining" and other neologisms using "man" as a derogatory prefix.

Criticism of the concept

Sociologist Allan G. Johnson argues in The Gender Knot: Unraveling our Patriarchal Legacy that accusations of man-hating have been used to put down feminists and to shift attention onto men, reinforcing a male-centered culture. Johnson posits that culture offers no comparable anti-male ideology to misogyny and that "people often confuse men as individuals with men as a dominant and privileged category of people" and that "[given the] reality of women's oppression, male privilege, and men's enforcement of both, it's hardly surprising that every woman should have moments where she resents or even hates men".

Marc A. Ouellette argues in International Encyclopedia of Men and Masculinities that "misandry lacks the systemic, transhistoric, institutionalized, and legislated antipathy of misogyny"; in his view, assuming a parallel between misogyny and misandry overly simplifies relations of gender and power.

Gilmore also argues that misogyny is a "near-universal phenomenon" and that there is no male equivalent to misogyny. He argues that misandry is "different from the intensely ad feminam aspect of misogyny that targets women no matter what they believe or do".

Michael Kimmel states of misogyny and misandry that "claiming some sort of equivalent parallel is, of course, utterly tendentious".

See also

 Airline seating sex discrimination controversy
 Are All Men Pedophiles?
 Bachelor tax
 Boys are stupid, throw rocks at them! controversy
 Circumcision controversies
 Female chauvinism
 Gynocentrism
 Male expendability
 Male genital mutilation
 Men's studies
 Reverse sexism
 Separatist feminism
 TERF
 Testosterone poisoning

Notes

References

Further reading

External links

 article critical of the use of the term

"Lay off men, Lessing tells feminists" by Fiachra Gibbons, The Guardian, 14 August 2001

 
Gender-related prejudices
Prejudice and discrimination by type
Sexism